Stanley is a 1999 award-winning stop motion animated short film written, directed and animated by Suzie Templeton. It was made at the Surrey Institute of Art & Design, University College, now the University for the Creative Arts in England.

Synopsis 
While his frustrated wife wreaks violence and death in the kitchen, Stanley finds love in a giant cabbage he is growing in his back yard.

Awards 
Best College Student Animation: 2000 Nashville Independent Film Festival, USA
Luna de Bronce: 2000 International Film Festival Cinema Jove, Spain
Grand Prize: 2000 Dervio International Cartoons and Comics Festival, Italy
Prizewinner - Student Film Showcase: 2000 Hamptons International Film Festival, USA
Best Student Animation: 2000 Fort Lauderdale International Film Festival, USA
Jury Prize: 2000 International Short Film Festival ‘Der Eisenstein’, Germany
Best Student Animation: 2000 FAN International Short Film and Animation Festival, UK
Best Animation: 2000 Interfilm Berlin Short Film Festival, Berlin, Germany  
Doug Wandrei Award for Best Lighting Design, 2001 Ann Arbor Film Festival, USA
Golden Sun Award - Best of the Festival: 2001 California SUN International Animation Festival, USA
Best Animation: 2001 Bare Bones International Independent Film Festival, USA
Best Short Animation: 2002 Fantasy Film Festival, Malaga, Spain

External links
Stanley - official site

Suzie Templeton - official website

British animated short films
1999 films
Stop-motion animated short films
British silent short films
Silent films in color
1990s British films